Theatre Row is an entertainment district of Off Broadway theatres on 42nd Street in Midtown Manhattan west of Ninth Avenue. The space originally referred to a 1977 redevelopment project to convert adult entertainment venues into theatres between 9th and Tenth Avenues on the south side of 42nd Street. However with the success of the district the name is often used to describe any theatre on either side of the street from Ninth Avenue to the Hudson River as more theatres have been built along the street.

From east to west, theatres along Theatre Row are:

Laurie Beechman Theatre
Theatre Row Building
Playwrights Horizons
Stage 42 (formerly the Little Shubert Theatre) 
Pershing Square Signature Center
Castillo Theatre
Pearl Theatre

Original 1977 theatres
Theatre Row was first established in 1977 in conjunction with the 42nd Street Development Corporation in an effort to convert adult entertainment venues into Off Broadway theatres. The first theatres involved in 1977 were:

Black Theatre Alliance 
Harlem Children's Theatre
INTAR Theatre (now on 52nd Street)
Lion Theatre (now commemorated by a theatre in the Theatre Row Building)
Nat Horne Musical Theatre
Playwrights Horizons
Harold Clurman Theatre (now commemorated by a theatre in the Theatre Row Building)
South Street Theatre

Further reading
 Bianco, Anthony (2004). Ghosts of 42nd Street: A History of America's Most Infamous Block. New York: HarperCollins Books, .

References

Neighborhoods in Manhattan
Entertainment districts in New York (state)
Hell's Kitchen, Manhattan
42nd Street (Manhattan)